Leninsky Komsomol can refer to the following vessels:

 
 , lead ship of her class of merchant vessels
  - the name of a series of 25 dry cargo merchant tweendeckers with turbine main engines that were built in the USSR.